The 2022 Historic Grand Prix of Monaco was the thirteenth running of the Historic Grand Prix of Monaco, a motor racing event for heritage Grand Prix, Voiturettes, Formula One, Formula Two and Sports cars.

Report

Série A1 
In Race A1, second-placed qualifier Nicholas Topliss, driving ERA R4A, got the best launch and took the lead ahead of polesitter Mark Gillies in ERA R3A. He pulled a gap of a few seconds and appeared set for victory, until Gillies put on a charge and closed up behind him on lap 7 of 10. The two raced closely and began to catch lapped traffic around the same time. Trying to stay ahead, Topliss made a bold move to lap the Riley Dobbs of Thierry Chanoine at Sante Devote on lap 9, catching Chanoine unaware and making contact on the exit. Topliss retired from the race; Chanoine continued to finish sixth on the road, but a 10 second penalty for jumping the start demoted him to seventh. Patrick Blakeney-Edwards, driving a Frazer Nash Monoplace, had a storming opening few laps and moved from twelfth on the grid to fourth by the middle of the race. Topliss' retirement promoted him to the final step on the podium. Fritz Burkard in a Maserati 4CL had been strong in qualifying but started at the back of the grid. He gained twelve places to finish eighth.

Série A2 
Race A2 was won from pole by Claudia Hürtgen, driving a Ferrari 246 owned by Alex Birkenstock. Hürtgen was a late call-up: Birkenstock was entered for the car but could not attend due to family circumstances. She was followed closely throughout the race by Tony Wood in a Tec-Mec F415 but appeared to have the measure of him. The battle for fourth place was hotly contested between Max Smith-Hilliard, Guillermo Fierro-Eleta and Joaquín Folch-Rusiñol. Smith-Hilliard made a bold overtaking move on Folch-Rusiñol into the Nouvelle Chicane, forcing Folch-Rusiñol off track; Folch-Rusiñol then straight-lined the chicane to maintain position. Both drivers received a 10 second penalty. Michael Birch in the Connaught B spun at Virage Antony Noghès on lap 9 of 10 and was immediately collected by Marshall Bailey and Folch-Rusiñol, who had just re-passed Smith-Hilliard. The two leaders, who were coming up to lap these cars at the same time, narrowly avoided a collision. The pile-up blocked the track and the race was red-flagged, with the results taken back to the end of lap 7. Marino Franchitti made his first race appearance at Monaco during this race, only for the driveshaft of his Maserati 250F to snap on the second lap.

Série B 
Race B featured a tight battle between Joe Colasacco in a Ferrari 1512 and Mark Shaw in a Lotus 21, Shaw applying intense pressure until taking the lead after a bold move at Sainte Devote on lap 8 of 10. It was Colasacco's turn to apply pressure and, distracted, Shaw locked his brakes and went into the barrier at the same corner one lap later. Colasacco cruised unchallenged to victory.

Série C 
Race C was a close fight between Frederic Wakeman in a Cooper T38 (Mk2) and Lukas Halusa in a Maserati 300S. Polesitter Wakeman got the best launch but Halusa set a series of fastest laps to remain close behind. On lap 6 of 10, Albert Otten spun his Kieft Sport at Sainte Devote and hit the inside barrier. This triggered a full course yellow, tightening the field and leading to a three-car shootout for victory between Wakeman, Halusa and Guillermo Fierro-Eleta in another 300S. Fierro-Eleta attempted to pass three-wide for the lead at Mirabeau Haute while the group were negotiating backmarkers. He brushed the wall, ending his challenge for the lead, but went on to finish third. Halusa, in his trademark oversteering driving style, kept the pressure on Wakeman until the final lap when his tyres appeared to go off.

Série D 
In Race D, Jordan Grogor in a Matra MS120C jumped the start to take the lead from third on the grid. Polesitter Stuart Hall in a McLaren M19A re-passed him at Tabac on the opening lap and went on unchallenged to victory. Esteban Gutiérrez, in a BRM P153 once piloted by countryman Pedro Rodríguez, pressured Grogor for second position until Gutiérrez's car became stuck in gear and ground to a halt at the Nouvelle Chicane. This brought out a full-course yellow on lap 7 of 12 while his car was recovered. At the restart, Max Smith-Hilliard pressured Jamie Constable for sixth, and eventually Constable spun at La Rascasse on lap 10. He got going again and only lost two positions. On the final lap, David Shaw, in the Eifelland-March 721, locked his brakes at Tabac and hit the wall. Grogor finished second on the road, but was handed a 10 second penalty which demoted him to third.

Série E 
Entered for Race E was James Davison, an Australian racing driver and veteran of many North American racing series. He piloted the Hill GH1 chassis in which countryman Alan Jones scored his first points in the 1975 German Grand Prix. Davison had an issue at the start of the race, leading to an extra formation lap. The race distance was shortened from 18 laps to 17 laps accordingly. He would rejoin on lap 5 of 17 but was not classified. Roberto Moreno jumped the start and was awarded a 10 second penalty. He spent the entire race pressuring Michael Lyons for third so that he could build enough of a gap to stay ahead of Nick Padmore at the finish. He was unable to do so and was classified fifth behind Padmore. The Shadows of Gregor Fisken and Jean-Denis Delétraz and the Tyrrell of Roald Goethe engaged in a close battle for eighth. On lap 10, Goethe attempted to follow Delétraz as he lapped Piero Lottini at La Rascasse, but Lottini did not see Goethe and the two collided. Stuart Hall enjoyed his second victory of the weekend, challenged all the way to the finish by Marco Werner.

Série F 
Two cars missed qualifying in Race F: Luciano Biamino, who suffered a fuel pressure issue, and Frédéric Lajoux, whose car had been hit at the start of qualifying. Both drivers made the start, and would benefit greatly from a race of attrition. Polesitter Miles Griffiths retired to the pits after the formation lap. This made third-placed qualifier David Shaw, in a Williams FW06, the first car on the inside. Shaw got a slow launch; fifth-placed qualifier Mark Hazell, in a Williams FW07B, tried to pass him but the two made contact. Shaw suffered front wing damage and fell to the back of the field, while Hazell recovered to run seventh. Michael Lyons, in a Hesketh 308E, shot into a lead he would not relinquish. Behind him, there was a three-way contest for third place between Philip Hall in a Theodore TR1, Lee Mowle in a Lotus 78 and Jamie Constable in a Shadow DN8. On lap 8 of 18, the full course yellow was triggered when Hazell came to a halt on the rise to Beau Rivage. Mowle got the jump on Hall after the restart. Hall's challenge later ended after hitting the wall on the exit of Virage Antony Noghès, leaving Constable to continue the close fight for third. However, Constable suffered a car failure at the Nouvelle Chicane on lap 14. A second full course yellow was brought out on lap 16 when Paul Tattersall hit the wall at Mirabeau Haute. This resulted in a one-and-a-half-lap shootout to the flag, allowing last-row starter Lajoux, who had methodically worked his way through the field, to challenge Mowle for an unlikely podium. Mowle resisted Lajoux's challenge and finished third behind Lyons and Michael Cantillon in a Tyrrell 010.

Série G 
For 2022, the minimum age limit for cars was lowered by five years to 1985. The practice session for Race G was interrupted by a collision between the Tyrrells of British driver Martin Stretton and North American driver Ken Tyrrell. Stretton's car was too badly damaged to feature in qualifying, while Tyrrell went on to qualify tenth and finish sixth.

David Shaw in an Arrows A4 struggled to get away on the formation lap; he received a push start but did not make it to his original position of third by the end of the lap. He moved through the grid to recover his spot, but incurred a 10 second penalty for doing so.  in a Williams FW08C had also failed to get away and did not start the race. Marco Werner in a Lotus 87B and Michael Lyons in a Lotus 92 ran first and second, trading fastest laps for the opening phase of the race. Eventually Lyons' challenge faded somewhat and Nick Padmore in a Lotus 88B began to challenge him for second. Behind them, Shaw and Mark Hazell in another FW08C battled for fourth place. On lap 12 of 18, Christophe d'Ansembourg in a Williams FW07C brushed the barriers in the tunnel and damaged his suspension, causing him to retire from the race. He left a large piece of debris on the exit of the Nouvelle Chicane, which Shaw ran over on the next lap. Immediately after, Shaw's car suffered a failure on entry to Tabac and he crashed heavily into the wall. He walked away unscathed. At the restart after the ensuing full course yellow, Jamie Constable in a Tyrrell 011 pressured Padmore for third place but endured heartbreak when his car came to a stop within sight of the finish line on the final lap. He ended up classified eighth, the first car a lap down. Alejandro Walter Chahwan in a March 811 suffered a retirement shortly after the final restart. Hazell was fifth with two laps to go, but suddenly fell to ninth. He set the fastest lap on the final tour, a small consolation having lost so many places late in the race.

Results

Summary

Série A1: Pre-war Grand Prix cars and Voiturettes

Série A2: Front-engined Grand Prix cars built before 1961

Série B: Rear-engine, 1500, F1 Grand Prix cars from 1961 to 1965 and F2

Série C: Front-engine Sport Racing cars from 1952 to 1957

Série D: F1 Grand Prix cars 3L from 1966 to 1972

Série E: F1 Grand Prix cars 3L from 1973 to 1976

Série F: F1 Grand Prix cars 3L from 1977 to 1980

Série G: F1 Grand Prix cars 3L from 1981 to 1985

References 

Historic Grand Prix of Monaco
Historic motorsport events
Monaco Grand Prix